The 2003 Atlanta Braves season marked the franchise's 38th season in Atlanta and 133rd overall. The Braves won their 9th consecutive division title, finishing 10 games ahead of the second-place Florida Marlins. The Braves lost the 2003 Divisional Series to the Chicago Cubs, 3 games to 2. The Braves finished 2003 with their best offensive season in franchise history, hitting a franchise record 235 home runs. Atlanta also had one of the most noteworthy combined offensive outfield productions in league history. 

The Braves' starting rotation had new faces in 2003, but aged pitchers. Opposite of what they were traditionally known for in years earlier. Greg Maddux was joined by trade acquisitions Mike Hampton and Russ Ortiz, free agent Shane Reynolds and rookie Horacio Ramírez. Critics noted had Atlanta had a younger staff with this offense, they would've been more likely to win the World Series. Marcus Giles had an All-Star season as the Braves' second baseman and Gary Sheffield as the Braves' right fielder. Sheffield finished with a top 5 voting in NL MVP voting. 2003 also marked the last season for Maddux, ending his tenure in Atlanta after 11 seasons.

Offseason
 November 18, 2002: Mike Hampton was traded by the Florida Marlins with cash to the Atlanta Braves for Ryan Baker (minors) and Tim Spooneybarger. (Hampton had been traded to the Marlins from the Colorado Rockies on November 16, 2002) 
 November 20, 2002: Donzell McDonald was signed as a free agent with the Atlanta Braves.
 December 16, 2002: Ray King was traded by the Milwaukee Brewers to the Atlanta Braves for John Foster and Wes Helms.
 December 17, 2002: Russ Ortiz was traded by the San Francisco Giants to the Atlanta Braves for Damian Moss and Merkin Valdez.
 December 18, 2002: Paul Byrd was signed as a free agent with the Atlanta Braves. (Byrd did not play for the Braves in 2003)
 December 19, 2002: Greg Maddux was signed as a free agent with the Atlanta Braves.
 December 20, 2002: Johnny Estrada was traded by the Philadelphia Phillies to the Atlanta Braves for Kevin Millwood.
 January 6, 2003: Robert Fick signed as a free agent with the Atlanta Braves. 
 January 8, 2003: Julio Franco was signed as a free agent with the Atlanta Braves.
 January 23, 2003: Roberto Hernandez signed as a free agent with the Atlanta Braves.
 April 10, 2003: Shane Reynolds signed as a free agent with the Atlanta Braves.

Regular season
 In 2003, John Smoltz set a Major League record (since tied) by having 34 saves before the All-Star Break.
 May 23, 2003 – During the Atlanta Braves 15-3 victory over the Cincinnati Reds, Braves players Rafael Furcal, Mark DeRosa and Gary Sheffield hit consecutive home runs to start the game.
 On August 10, 2003, Rafael Furcal of the Braves had an unassisted triple play. He caught the liner, touched second base, and tagged the runner going back to first base.

Opening Day starters

Season standings

National League East

Record vs. opponents

Notable transactions
 August 29, 2003: Jaret Wright was selected off waivers by the Atlanta Braves from the San Diego Padres.
 Notable draft signings in 2003 include Jarrod Saltalamacchia (36th overall) and Jonny Venters (30th round).

Roster

Player stats

Batting
Note: Pos = Position; G = Games played; AB = At bats; H = Hits; Avg. = Batting average; HR = Home runs; RBI = Runs batted in

Other batters
Note: G = Games played; AB = At bats; H = Hits; Avg. = Batting average; HR = Home runs; RBI = Runs batted in

Pitching

Starting pitchers
Note: G = Games pitched; IP = Innings pitched; W = Wins; L = Losses; ERA = Earned run average; SO = Strikeouts

Relief pitchers
Note: G = Games pitched; W = Wins; L = Losses; SV = Saves; ERA = Earned run average; SO = Strikeouts

2003 National League Division Series

Atlanta Braves vs. Chicago Cubs
Chicago wins the series, 3-2

Award winners
2003 Major League Baseball All-Star Game

Farm system

LEAGUE CHAMPIONS: Rome, GCL Braves

References

 2003 Atlanta Braves at Baseball Reference

National League East champion seasons
Atlanta Braves seasons
Atlanta Braves Season, 2003
Atlanta Braves Season, 2003
Atlanta